The Antón Ruiz River is a river of Humacao and Naguabo in Puerto Rico. It is 6.73 miles long. It begins at Collores and Mambiche creeks.

A bridge carrying Puerto Rico Highway 3 and another bridge carrying Puerto Rico Highway 53 cross over the Antón Ruiz River in Humacao.

See also
List of rivers of Puerto Rico

References

External links
USGS Hydrologic Unit Map – Caribbean Region (1974)
Rios de Puerto Rico

Rivers of Puerto Rico